The Umbelopsidaceae are a family of fungi in the order Mucorales. Members of this family (currently in the single genera Umbelopsis) have a widespread distribution.

References

External links
 
 Index Fungorum

Zygomycota
Monogeneric fungus families